The men's 3 metre springboard diving competition at the 2012 Olympic Games in London was held on 6 and 7 August at the Aquatics Centre within the Olympic Park.

Ilya Zakharov from Russia won the gold medal. China's Qin Kai took silver and He Chong won bronze.

Format

The competition was held in three rounds:

Preliminary round: All 29 divers perform six dives; the top 18 divers advance to the semi-final.
Semi-final: The 18 divers perform six dives; the scores of the qualifications are erased and the top 12 divers advance to the final.
Final: The 12 divers perform six dives; the semi-final scores are erased and the top three divers win the gold, silver and bronze medals accordingly.

Schedule 
All times are British Summer Time (UTC+1)

Results
Source:

*Stephan Feck, competing in his first Olympics, received a 0.0 on his second dive after he slipped on the board and landed on his back in the water. He returned for his third dive but did not perform his fourth, fifth or sixth, thereby removing himself from the competition.

References

Diving at the 2012 Summer Olympics
2012
Men's events at the 2012 Summer Olympics